Frederick H. Jackson (October 9, 1847 – 1915) was an American businessman and politician, who served as the Lieutenant Governor of Rhode Island from 1905 to 1908.

Biography 
Jackson was born in Kirkland, New York to the Rev. Frederick J. Jackson and Hannah M. Jackson. He graduated from Cornell University in 1873, and worked in the insurance industry. 
 
He married Annie Blanchard Ellis in 1874, and their children included Frederick Ellis Jackson, principal of the Providence architectural firm, Jackson, Robertson & Adams.

He was a member of the Central Congregational Church in Providence, Rhode Island.

References

1847 births
1915 deaths
Lieutenant Governors of Rhode Island
People from Oneida County, New York
19th-century American businesspeople
20th-century American businesspeople
Cornell University alumni